Davara rufulella is a species of snout moth in the genus Davara. It was described by Ragonot in 1889, and is known from Puerto Rico.

References

Moths described in 1889
Phycitinae